Apamea auranticolor is a moth of the family Noctuidae. It is found throughout western North America.

The wingspan is about 36 mm.

Subspecies
Apamea auranticolor auranticolor
Apamea auranticolor barnesii

Apamea sora was formerly considered to be a subspecies of Apamea auranticolor.

External links
Images
Bug Guide

Apamea (moth)
Moths of North America
Moths described in 1873
Taxa named by Augustus Radcliffe Grote